The 2023 IFSC Climbing World Championships, the 18th edition, will be held in Bern, Switzerland from 1 to 12 August 2023. The championships will consist of lead, speed, bouldering, and bouder & lead combined events, along with the paraclimbing event. The speed and combined events will serve as the first qualifying event for the 2024 Summer Olympics. PostFinance Arena will serve as the event venue.

See also
2023 IFSC Climbing World Cup

References

IFSC Climbing World Championships
Climbing World Championships
IFSC
Sports competitions in Bern
International sports competitions hosted by Switzerland
World Climbing Championships